The Cinema Theater is a motion picture theater in Rochester, New York. Opened as a neighborhood motion picture theater in 1914, it is one of the oldest continuously operated motion picture theaters in the United States. The theater is located at the corner of South Clinton Avenue and South Goodman Street in Rochester.

History
Originally named "The Clinton", due to a circular arrangement of wooden benches with an open area in the middle, it was affectionately referred to as the "flea pit", a name which stuck for many years — and long after the original dirt floor was covered and the benches were replaced with seats. In 1949 it was renamed the Cinema by its owners, Morris Slotknick and Philip Cohen, and four years later it was enlarged to extend a full city block, and its distinctive Art Deco facade installed. The business was acquired by Jo Ann Morreale in 1985.

In April 2006, The Cinema was about to close due to financial difficulties, but long-time patron and real-estate developer John Trickey stepped in and financially brought the cinema back. This was celebrated with a ceremony of "Relighting the Marque". Trickey formally took over as the sole owner of the theater in 2012. In 2018, the business was leased to a local couple while Trickey retains ownership of the building.

Current Status
The Cinema has one screen and films tend to rotate weekly. They show a mixture of mainstream and independent films. The schedule usually features an afternoon matinee on weekends and daily double features in the evening. The theater is also known for having resident pet cats that moviegoers can socialize with.

References

External links 

Official Website

Cinemas and movie theaters in New York (state)
Culture of Rochester, New York
Art Deco architecture in Rochester, New York